Jucemar Décio Ribeiro da Silva, known as Jucemar Gaucho, is a Brazilian footballer who last played for Sapucaiense.

Jucemar played for CRB in Serie B during 2012, on loan from CSA.

References

External links
 Profile at the Brazilian Football Confederation page 

1986 births
Living people
Brazilian footballers
Brazilian expatriate footballers
Association football midfielders
Expatriate footballers in Hungary
Újpest FC players
Villa Nova Atlético Clube players